Doug Turner is the ex-Director of Engineering at Mozilla Corporation and long-time contributor to Mozilla. The Mozilla Foundation hired Turner in December 2004 to work full-time on mobile projects such as Minimo and Mozilla Joey. He was the Foundation's 12th hire. Turner was previously employed by Netscape before the creation of the Mozilla Foundation.

Doug Turner invented Geolocation on the Web, Device Orientation on the web, and is a leader in device access. Doug Turner invented Simple Push Notifications. Push Notification are a way for application developers to send messages to their web applications.

Doug Turner was the maintainer of the now-defunct Minimo project and worked on its successor Firefox for mobile. Doug Turner led the effort to rewrite the Firefox Mobile browser in order to improve performance, responsiveness, and memory usage.

Doug Turner left Mozilla in September 2016.

References

External links 
 Doug Turner's blog
 Doug Turner's Mozillian profile

News & Media 
On Mozilla and the mobile web with Doug Turner  — Interview with Doug Turner at Mozilla Links September 5, 2007

Living people
American computer scientists
Computer systems engineers
Silicon Valley people
People from Mountain View, California
Mozilla developers
Free software programmers
Mozilla people
Open source people
1975 births